Junior Cornette (born 15 April 1966) is a retired Guyanese sprinter.

He won the bronze medal in the 200 metres at the 1990 Central American and Caribbean Games. He also competed at the 1991 and 1993 World Championships without reaching the final.

Achievements

References

1966 births
Living people
Guyanese male sprinters
World Athletics Championships athletes for Guyana
Competitors at the 1990 Central American and Caribbean Games
Athletes (track and field) at the 1991 Pan American Games
Central American and Caribbean Games bronze medalists for Guyana
Central American and Caribbean Games medalists in athletics
Pan American Games competitors for Guyana